Manuel Gomes da Silva, known as Nélito (born 24 December 1958) is a Portuguese football manager and a former player who spent his whole playing career with Braga.

Club career
He made his professional debut in the Primeira Liga for Braga on 2 April 1978 in a game against Varzim. Over his career, he played 160 games on the top level of Portuguese club football.

References

1958 births
Living people
Sportspeople from Braga
Portuguese footballers
Association football defenders
S.C. Braga players
Primeira Liga players
Portuguese football managers